Dominique Azzaro (born 11 February 1948) is a French former boxer. He competed in the men's lightweight event at the 1968 Summer Olympics. At the 1968 Summer Olympics in Mexico City, he received a bye in the Round of 64.  In the Round of 32 he lost to José Antonio Duran of Mexico in his first fight.

References

External links
 

1948 births
Living people
French male boxers
Olympic boxers of France
Boxers at the 1968 Summer Olympics
Sportspeople from Tunis
Lightweight boxers